St John the Baptist Cathedral, Sligo or more properly the Cathedral of St Mary the Virgin and St John the Baptist, Sligo but also known as Sligo Cathedral is one of two cathedral churches in the diocese of Kilmore, Elphin and Ardagh (the other is St Fethlimidh's Cathedral, Kilmore) in the Church of Ireland. It is situated in the town of Sligo, Ireland in the ecclesiastical province of Armagh.

The church was built as St John's Church in the mid-18th century to the design of architect Richard Cassels, who adopted a basilica pattern from Roman architecture.

See also
Dean of Elphin and Ardagh
List of cathedrals in Ireland

External links
 Sligo Cathedral Group (Church of Ireland)

References

Sligo
Diocese of Kilmore, Elphin and Ardagh
Sligo (town)
18th-century churches in Ireland
18th-century Church of Ireland church buildings